Askim Station is located at Askim, Norway on the Eastern Østfold Line. The railway station is served by the Oslo Commuter Rail line L22 from Oslo Central Station. The station was opened with the eastern line of Østfold Line in 1882.

Railway stations in Askim
Railway stations on the Østfold Line
Railway stations opened in 1882
1882 establishments in Norway